Lautaro Darío Giaccone (born 1 February 2001) is an Argentine professional footballer who plays as an attacking midfielder for Ferro Carril Oeste, on loan from Rosario Central.

Club career
Giaccone started his career with 9 de Julio at the age of three, before having stints in San Francisco with Los Andes, aged six, and Sportivo Belgrano. In January 2017, Giaccone joined the academy of Rosario Central at the age of fifteen; having had a trial in the preceding December. In August 2020, the attacking midfielder signed his first professional contract. He made the first-team's substitute's bench on 2 January 2021 for a win over Defensa y Justicia, though wasn't selected to come on in the Copa de la Liga Profesional. Giaccone's senior debut arrived on 9 January in the same competition against Lanús.

On 10 March 2022, Giaccone joined Primera Nacional club Ferro Carril Oeste on loan for the rest of 2022 with a purchase option.

International career
Giaccone represented Argentina at U18 level. He was selected for Esteban Solari's preliminary squad ahead of the 2019 COTIF Tournament in Spain; though didn't make the final cut. He also received a call-up from the U20s at around that time, though Rosario didn't let him join up with the squad.

Personal life
Giaccone is the son of football manager Ariel Giaccone, who managed Sportivo Belgrano whilst his son was on their academy books.

Career statistics
.

Notes

References

External links

2001 births
Living people
People from San Francisco, Córdoba
Argentine footballers
Argentina youth international footballers
Association football midfielders
Argentine Primera División players
Primera Nacional players
Rosario Central footballers
Ferro Carril Oeste footballers
Sportspeople from Córdoba Province, Argentina